The 1926 Duke Blue Devils football team was an American football team that represented Duke University as an independent during the 1926 college football season. In its first season under head coach James DeHart, the team compiled a 3–6 record and outscored opponents by a total of 124 to 106. James Thompson was the team captain.

Schedule

References

Duke
Duke Blue Devils football seasons
Duke Blue Devils football